Beacon Villages may refer to:

A group of villages near Cosdon Beacon, Dartmoor, England:
Belstone
South Tawton
South Zeal
Sticklepath
A group of villages near Ivinghoe Beacon, Chiltern Hills, England:
Cheddington
Ivinghoe
Marsworth
Pitstone